Richard Anthony Scheuring, D.O., FAsMA is an osteopathic physician and a NASA flight surgeon. Dr. Scheuring holds the rank of lieutenant colonel and was involved in the constellation program at the Lyndon B. Johnson Space Center. He graduated from Midwestern University's Chicago College of Osteopathic Medicine in 1993 and completed a family medicine residency. After completing his first residency, Dr. Scheuring pursued additional training in aerospace medicine and preventive medicine at Wright State University.

See also
 Space medicine

References

Living people
American osteopathic physicians
Space medicine
Chicago College of Osteopathic Medicine alumni
Year of birth missing (living people)